Most non-water floods involve storage facilities suddenly releasing liquids, or industrial retaining reservoirs releasing toxic waste. Storage facility incidents usually cover a small area but can be catastrophic in cities; for example, a molasses tank failure in 1919 led to the Great Molasses Flood that killed 21 people in Boston, US. 

Industrial retaining reservoirs are often used to store toxic waste, and when they fail they can flood a large area, causing physical and environmental damage. The 2010 failure of a reservoir at the Ajka alumina plant in Hungary flooded a small town and killed several, while the cleanup from the 2008 Kingston Fossil Plant spill in Tennessee, US took several years and killed at least 40 workers involved.

List

See also 
 List of oil spills

Lists of floods